The Bambitious Nara is a professional basketball team that competes in the second division of the Japanese B.League.

Roster

Notable players
 
Jamar Abrams
Ruben Boykin

Josh Dollard
Gary Hamilton
Charles Hinkle
Adrian Moss
Tshilidzi Nephawe
Andy Ogide
Josh Ritchart

Wesley Witherspoon
Terrance Woodbury

Coaches
Koto Toyama
Ryutaro Onodera
Kohei Eto
Željko Pavličević
Haruyuki Ishibashi
Chris Thomas
Takeo Mabashi
Fernando Calero Gil

Arenas

Naraden Arena
Jtekt Arena Nara
Kingyo Square
Gojo City Ueno Park Gymnasium
Tenri City General Gymnasium

References

External links
Bambitious on Twitter

 
Basketball teams in Japan
Sport in Nara Prefecture
Basketball teams established in 2013
2013 establishments in Japan
Nara, Nara